is an album by Saori Atsumi. The album contains multiple tracks previously used in anime: "Biidama" is the ending theme to Genshiken, "Mōsukoshi… Mōsukoshi…" is the ending theme to Midori Days, and "Ai" is the opening theme to Kujibiki♥Unbalance.

Track listing

Notes and references

2007 albums
Lantis (company) albums
Saori Atsumi albums